Glorieta de Insurgentes is a large roundabout formed at the intersection of Avenida Chapultepec and Avenida de los Insurgentes, in Mexico City. In it flow both Oaxaca Avenue and the streets of Jalapa and Génova, which give access to Colonia Roma Norte for the first and the Zona Rosa of the Colonia Juarez for the latter.

Description 

Glorieta de Insurgentes consists of the vehicular pass of the avenue that gives it its name, the pedestrian center surrounded by shops under it and its access to the Metrobús Insurgentes station and the Insurgentes metro station. Still further down the Metro is the overpass of Avenida Chapultepec. Pedestrians, Metrobús, Metro, cars and heavy transport all converge here.

Sites 

On one side of the Glorieta de Insurgentes is the Zona Rosa, which is one of the most important tourist, commercial and financial places in Mexico City. It is recognized as the area with the most restaurants and nightclubs aimed at the gay population of the city.

To the south of the Glorieta de Insurgentes, in the Colonia Roma Norte, there is a replica of the Fuente de Cibeles. The Public Security Secretariat of the Federal District and several schools, cinemas, hospitals and places are located around the Glorieta de Insurgentes.

External links

 "The Real-World Locations of 14 Sci-Fi Dystopias". Atlas Obscura

Landmarks in Mexico City
Roundabouts and traffic circles in Mexico